Oregon is a nuclear powered attack submarine in the United States Navy. She is to be the fourth vessel to carry the name Oregon, the 33rd state of US, and she will be the 20th . Secretary of the Navy Ray Mabus announced her name on 10 October 2014 at a ceremony hosted at the Battleship Oregon Memorial in Tom McCall Waterfront Park in Portland, Oregon.

Construction and Career 
Oregons keel was laid down on 8 July 2017, in a ceremony held at the Quonset Point Facility of General Dynamics Electric Boat in North Kingstown, Rhode Island, with sponsor Mrs. Dana L. Richardson, wife of Chief of Naval Operations, Admiral John Richardson, in attendance. On 5 October 2019, Mrs Richardson christened Oregon at Electric Boat in Groton, Connecticut. The ship was commissioned on 28 May 2022 at Naval Submarine Base New London.

On 23 December 2014 they were awarded an additional $121.8 million contract modification to buy long lead-time material for the three Virginia-class submarines. The US Navy awarded Electric Boat the contract to construct 10 Block IV Virginia-class submarines for $17.6 billion on 28 April 2014. The first Block IV, commenced in May 2014 with the tenth ship, scheduled for delivery in 2023.

On 28 May 2022, Oregon was commissioned in a ceremony at the Naval Submarine Base New London, Connecticut.

References

 

Virginia-class submarines